Floyd Tillman (December 8, 1914 – August 22, 2003) was an American country musician who, in the 1930s and 1940s, helped create the Western swing and honky tonk genres. Tillman was inducted into the Nashville Songwriters Hall of Fame in 1970 and the Country Music Hall of Fame in 1984.

Biography

Early life
He was born in Ryan, Oklahoma, United States, and grew up in the cotton-mill town of Post, Texas as a sharecropper's son. One of his early jobs was with Western Union as a telegraph operator. In the early 1930s, Tilman played mandolin and banjo at local dances and eventually took up the guitar.

Musical career
Tillman moved to San Antonio played lead guitar with Adolph Hofner, a Western swing bandleader, and soon developed into a songwriter and singer. He took a job with Houston pop bandleader Mack Clark in 1938, and played with Western swing groups fronted by Leon "Pappy" Selph and Cliff Bruner. He also worked with Ted Daffan, and singer and piano player Moon Mullican.

Tillman recorded as a featured vocalist with Selph's Blue Ridge Playboys in 1938, the same year Floyd scored his first major songwriting hit, "It Makes No Difference Now", giving him his own Decca recording contract. Jimmie Davis purchased the song from Floyd for $300, the co-rights to which he got back 28 years later.

Tillman's only No. 1 one song as a singer was "They Took the Stars Out of Heaven".  It reached the top of the charts in 1944. Previously, he had reached No. 2 with "I'm Gonna Change All My Ways". His 1944 hit, "Each Night At Nine", struck a chord with lonely servicemen during World War II. Axis Sally and Tokyo Rose played it heavily to encourage desertion.

A big hit for Tillman and also for Jimmy Wakely was 1948's "I Love You So Much It Hurts". His 1949 "Slippin' Around", one of the first country western "cheating" songs, was a hit for Tillman as well as Ernest Tubb, Texas Jim Robertson and the duo of Margaret Whiting and Jimmy Wakely. Tillman had another successful song with his own answer, "I'll Never Slip Around Again", as again did the Whiting-Wakely duo. He slowed down on his performing in the early 1950s, although he appeared on ABC-TV's Jubilee USA in 1958 and 1959.

Tillman's final album, recorded in 2002 and 2003 titled The Influence, paired him with country music artists who were influenced by his style and performing: Willie Nelson, Merle Haggard, Leona Williams, Dolly Parton, Justin Trevino, Ray Price, Frankie Miller, Hank Thompson, Connie Smith, Lawton Williams, Mel Tillis, Darrell McCall, Johnny Bush and George Jones. The project, released in April 2004, featured liner notes by Dr. Bill Malone, Bill Mack, Hank Thompson and Willie Nelson.  It was produced by Justin Trevino on Heart of Texas Records.

He was inducted into the Nashville Songwriters Hall of Fame in 1970, and the Country Music Hall of Fame in 1984.

Floyd Tillman died in August 2003, at the age of 88.

Singles

Selected works

References

External links
 
 Country Music Hall Of Fame, 1984
 
 
 Floyd Tillman mp3s
 portrait

Bibliography
 Vladimir Bogdanov, Chris Woodstra & Stephen Thomas Erlewine (ed.) (2003) All Music Guide to Country, 2nd ed., p. 750,  .
 Richard Carlin (1995) The Big Book of Country Music, A Biographical Encyclopedia, p. 458,  .
 The Editors of Country Music (magazine) (1994) The Comprehensive Country Music Encyclopedia, p. 387,  .
 Barry McCloud (1995) Definitive Country: The Ultimate Encyclopedia of Country Music and Its Performers, p. 810-1,  .
 Kurt Wolff (2000) Country Music: The Rough Guide, p. 149-50,  .

1914 births
2003 deaths
People from Ryan, Oklahoma
American country singer-songwriters
Country Music Hall of Fame inductees
RCA Victor artists
Starday Records artists
Liberty Records artists
Decca Records artists
Columbia Records artists
People from Post, Texas
20th-century American singers
Singer-songwriters from Texas
Singer-songwriters from Oklahoma
Country musicians from Texas
Country musicians from Oklahoma